The Golden Hits of Nora Aunor is the third studio album by Filipino singer-actress Nora Aunor released in 1971 by Alpha Records Corporation in the Philippines in LP format and later released in 1999 in a compilation/ cd format.   The album contains 12 tracks, one of them being "Love Story" which was made popular by Andy Williams in 1970..

Background
This was the third album that was released by Nora Aunor in 1971.  Aunor became one of the highest paid singers at that time and her singles were selling in large numbers. This album contains her hit songs from her previous albums.

Track listing

Side One

Side Two

References 

Nora Aunor albums
1971 albums